St John Bosco College is the name of a number of schools and colleges. Most have a religious heritage and are named after John Bosco:

St John Bosco College, Battersea, London, England
St John Bosco College, Lucknow, India
St John Bosco College, Sydney, Australia
St John Bosco Arts College, Liverpool, England

See also
Don Bosco School (disambiguation)
List of Salesian schools